De binocle (translation: The opera glass) is a short story written by Louis Couperus probably in or around 1897 in Dresden. The story was published for the first time in 1920 in Haagse Post and later in Proza.

Story 
A young Dutch-Indian journalist who is on vacation in Dresden decides to visit the Semperoper to see a performance of Wagner's Die Walküre. He gets a seat in the fourth range, in the most upper part of the auditorium. On the day of the performance, he buys himself an opera glass to see the play better. During the performance, he feels an almost irresistible urge to throw the opera glass to the head of a bald man sitting in the gallery right below him. Frightened by his own thought, he leaves the opera glass in the building after the play.  

Five years later, the same man is back again in Dresden and decides one more time to go to a performance of Die Walküre. The performance is again in the Semperoper, and he gets exactly the same seat as before. To his dismay, an usherette gives him the opera glass which he had left behind in the building the previous time. A few moments after the play has started, he throws the opera glass right against the head of a spectator who is sitting next to the married couple right below him. The spectator who is hit cries out loudly and then dies.

External links 
 'De binocle', Jan Fontijn, Leven in extase. Opstellen over mystiek en muziek, literatuur en decadentie rond 1900, Amsterdam, 1983, p. 27-33

1920 short stories
Short stories by Louis Couperus